The name Humberto has been used for five tropical cyclones in the Atlantic Ocean.  The name replaced Hugo, which was retired after the 1989 season.
 
 Hurricane Humberto (1995) – reached Category 2 Strength but remained in open sea.
 Hurricane Humberto (2001) – passed near Bermuda but caused no damage.
 Hurricane Humberto (2007) – made landfall in Texas as a strong Category 1 hurricane, causing one death and $50 million in damage.
 Hurricane Humberto (2013) – affected the Cape Verde Islands; the first of only two hurricanes in the 2013 season.
 Hurricane Humberto (2019) – Category 3 hurricane that impacted Bermuda.

The name Humberto was also unofficially given to an unusual subtropical cyclone which formed in the extreme south-eastern Pacific Ocean in January 2022.

Atlantic hurricane set index articles